"Man from the South" is a short story by Roald Dahl originally published in Collier's in 1948. It has been adapted several times for television and film, including a 1960 version that aired as an episode of Alfred Hitchcock Presents, and starred Steve McQueen, Neile Adams, and Peter Lorre.

Plot synopsis
While vacationing at a resort in Jamaica, the narrator encounters an elderly South American man named Carlos. They are soon joined by a young American naval cadet, who boasts about the reliability of his cigarette lighter. Carlos offers to bet his Cadillac against the American's left little finger that the American cannot ignite the lighter ten times in a row. The American accepts, with the narrator agreeing to act as referee and hold the car key, and they adjourn to Carlos' room.

After Carlos has a maid bring in the necessary supplies, he ties the American's left wrist to the table and the challenge begins. After the eighth successful strike, a woman bursts into the room and forces Carlos to drop the knife he has held ready to sever the American's finger. She explains that Carlos is mentally disturbed, having played this game so often in their home country that they had to flee in order to keep the authorities from committing him to a psychiatric hospital. He has taken 47 fingers and lost 11 cars, but no longer has anything of his own to bet with; she won it all from him long ago, including the car he claimed to own. As the narrator offers the key to her, she reaches out to take it with a hand that has only its thumb and one finger still attached.

Television adaptations

Alfred Hitchcock Presents (1960 episode) 

This short story was filmed as a 1960 episode of Alfred Hitchcock Presents titled "Man from the South", with a teleplay by William Fay and directed by Norman Lloyd.  The episode stars Steve McQueen as the reluctant young gambler, Peter Lorre as Carlos, the man who bets his car, and Neile Adams (McQueen's real-life wife) as a ravishing young woman McQueen's character meets. The story takes place in Las Vegas, Nevada. The car itself is merely described as a convertible. Although the mysterious woman who abruptly storms in is wearing gloves, her index, middle, and ring fingers are missing. In this adaptation, as part of the dramatic denouement after the woman appears and effectively aborts the bet, the gambler (McQueen) tries to relieve the stress of the young woman (Adams) by lighting her cigarette.  The lighter fails to start when flicked for this, a sly indicator of how narrowly the gambler avoided losing the bet.

1960 cast
 Alfred Hitchcock as the Host
 Steve McQueen as the Gambler
 Peter Lorre as Carlos
 Neile Adams as a Woman
 Tyler McVey as the Referee
 Marc Cavell as the Bellhop
 Katherine Squire as Carlos' Wife
 Phil Gordon as the Bartender

Tales of the Unexpected (1979 episode) 
The episode was remade in 1979 as the first episode of Dahl's television anthology series Tales of the Unexpected. The adaptation was by Kevin Goldstein-Jackson, direction by Michael Tuchner.  In this version, the car was a Jaguar.

1979 cast
 Roald Dahl as the Host
 Jose Ferrer as Carlos
 Pamela Stephenson as Cathy
 Michael Ontkean as Tommy
 Cyril Luckham as Rawlsden
 Katy Jurado as the Mysterious Woman

Alfred Hitchcock Presents (1985 episode) 
The episode was remade again for the 1985 series Alfred Hitchcock Presents.  Steve DeJarnatt wrote the teleplay based on William Fay's 1960 teleplay, and also directed. The episode featured Steven Bauer in McQueen's role, John Huston as Carlos, and Melanie Griffith (Bauer's wife at the time), Kim Novak, and Tippi Hedren (Griffith's mother). In this adaptation, the lighter successfully lights ten times. When the wife comes in, the tenth flame is blown out. Carlos is startled and drops the cleaver, nearly cutting off the young man's finger. After it is all over, he attempts to light himself a cigarette—and the lighter fails. The wife has only her index finger left.

1985 cast
 Alfred Hitchcock as the Host (colorized 1960 introduction)
 John Huston as Carlos
 Melanie Griffith as the Girl
 Steven Bauer as the Gambler
 Tippi Hedren as the Waitress
 Kim Novak as Rosa
 Jack Thibeau as Bronson
 Danny De La Paz as the Bellhop

Radio adaptations
In 2009, it was dramatized on BBC Radio Four with Andrew Sachs playing the sinister old man.

In 1949, the Dahl story was adapted by June Thomson for an episode of Radio City Playhouse. The adaptation, titled "Collector's Item", split the 30 minute run time with an adaptation of a Ray Bradbury story, titled "The Lake". Shortly after meeting in the bar, Carlos offers the gambler his green 1948 Cadillac parked outside. Due to the tastes of the time, some of the more grisly details were omitted from the presentation. The independent observer (the "referee") character realizes the female is a victim of the gambler, but we do not learn the exact details of the gambler's previous bets.

The scene is also parodied in an episode of American Dad!, "Stan's Night Out". Stan Smith wagers his life and the lives of three men against starting a lawn mower ten times, believing he would be able to do it as he had seen a television show which instructed him how to start a lawn mower "the first time, every time". Despite this, he fails on his first try.

Film adaptations
Dahl's story was adapted for a scene from the 1980 Tamil movie Ninaithale Inikkum, which involved a wager by a millionaire that a young man could not flick a cigarette into his lips ten times in a row without dropping it. The millionaire had put up his Toyota car against the young man's little finger. The young man managed it nine times in a row, but chickened out and refused a tenth attempt, thereby defaulting on the wager. The cigarette flick, in fact, was a signature move by iconic Tamil actor Rajinikanth.

Four Rooms
The story was also the basis for "The Man From Hollywood", Quentin Tarantino's segment of the 1995 anthology film Four Rooms.  The characters in this segment explicitly discuss the 1960 Hitchcock episode adaptation, although they incorrectly refer to the title as "The Man from Rio". In this version, the lighter fails on the first try and the referee—a bellhop who has been paid $1,000 for his trouble—chops off the finger and swiftly departs.

 1995 cast (as part of Four Rooms)
 Quentin Tarantino as Chester Rush, who offers the bet
 Jennifer Beals as Angela
 Tim Roth as Ted the Bellhop, who acts as referee and axe-man
 Paul Calderón as Norman, who accepts the bet
 Bruce Willis as Leo (uncredited)

"Cut", a segment of the 2004 film Three... Extremes (directed by Chanwook Park), was also inspired by the story.

References

External links
 
 
 
 

1948 short stories
Short stories by Roald Dahl
Works originally published in Collier's
1960 American television episodes
1985 American television episodes
1980 films
1995 films
2004 films
Short stories adapted into films
Horror short stories
Short stories about mental health